Fernando Daniel Martínez (born 30 May 1993) is a Mexican distance runner who competes over distances from 800 metres to the 10K run. He has won five national titles at the Mexican Athletics Championships, three at 1500 metres and two at 5000 metres. Martínez was the gold medallist over 5000 m at the 2019 Pan American Games and the 1500 m winner at the 2018 Central American and Caribbean Games.

He made his debut over the 10 kilometres distance in 2020.

In 2020, Martínez's ex-partner publicly denounced him for gender-based violence during their four-year relationship.

International competitions

National titles
Mexican Athletics Championships
1500 m: 2016, 2018, 2019
5000 m: 2018, 2019

Personal bests
800 metres – 1:51.78 (2016)
1500 metres – 3:39.26 (2017)
Mile run – 3:57.92 (2018)
5000 metres – 13:47.28 (2019)
10K run – 29:59 (2019)

See also
List of Central American and Caribbean Games medalists in athletics
List of Pan American Games medalists in athletics (men)

References

External links

1993 births
Living people
Mexican male middle-distance runners
Mexican male long-distance runners
Pan American Games competitors for Mexico
Pan American Games gold medalists for Mexico
Pan American Games gold medalists in athletics (track and field)
Athletes (track and field) at the 2019 Pan American Games
Central American and Caribbean Games competitors for Mexico
Central American and Caribbean Games gold medalists for Mexico
Central American and Caribbean Games gold medalists in athletics
Competitors at the 2018 Central American and Caribbean Games
Medalists at the 2019 Pan American Games
21st-century Mexican people
20th-century Mexican people